Ascot Racecourse ("ascot" pronounced , often pronounced ) is a dual-purpose British racecourse, located in Ascot, Berkshire, England, which is used for thoroughbred horse racing. It hosts 13 of Britain's 36 annual Flat Group 1 horse races and three Grade 1 Jumps races.

Ascot Racecourse is visited by approximately 600,000 people a year, accounting for 10% of all UK racegoers. Queen Elizabeth II used to visit the Ascot Racecourse quite frequently, sometimes even betting on the horses.

Ascot currently stages 26 days of racing over the course of the year, comprising 18 flat meetings between April and October, and 8 jump meetings between October and March. The Royal Meeting, held in June each year, remains the highlight of the British summer social calendar. The prestigious King George VI and Queen Elizabeth Stakes is run over the course in July.

History

Over its 300-year history, Ascot has established itself as a national institution, with Royal Ascot being the centrepiece of the British summer social calendar and the ultimate stage for the best racehorses in the world.

The racecourse was founded in 1711 by Queen Anne, when out riding from Windsor Castle, she came upon an area of open heath that looked, in her words, 'ideal for horses to gallop at full stretch'. Her plans for a new race meeting were subsequently announced in the London Gazette of 12 July 1711.

That first meeting was held on 11 August 1711, the original date (and a race scheduled for 6 August) having been postponed for reasons unspecified, although it has been speculated that the course simply wasn't ready. The Queen and a "brilliant suite" drove from Windsor Castle to witness it, with the first race being a seven horse £50 plate, won by a horse called Doctor owned by the Duke of St Albans.

Queen Anne's gift to racing, founding the Royal Racecourse, is marked by the tradition of opening Royal Ascot with The Queen Anne Stakes run over the straight mile.

The first permanent building was not erected until 1793, and was built by local Windsor builder George Slingsby. Holding 1,650 people, it was used for almost fifty years. In 1813 an Act of Parliament ensured that the Ascot Heath would be kept and used as a racecourse for the public in the future, securing racing at Ascot for future generations. A new grandstand was opened in 1839 at a cost of £10000.

The administration of the Royal Racecourse is handled on behalf of the Crown by a representative appointed by the Monarch. Up until 1901, the racecourse was managed by the Master of the Royal Buckhounds. Lord Churchill was appointed His Majesty's Representative in 1901, responsible for running the course and determining entrance to the Royal Enclosure. The Ascot Authority was established in 1913 by a further Act of Parliament, with His Majesty's Representative becoming Senior Trustee. Today, as Ascot Authority (Holdings) Limited, Ascot has a formal board chaired by Sir Francis Brooke Bt. who also serves as Her Majesty's Representative (Senior Trustee) at Ascot.

Between 1940 and 1943 racing was not run at Ascot. The racecourse was commandeered by the army with the Grandstand providing accommodation for gunners of the Royal Artillery. Racing resumed on 15 May 1943 with an eight-race card. The first post-war fixture was held on 21 May 1945, when the then 19-year-old Princess Elizabeth attended Ascot for the first time. The first National Hunt meeting was held at Ascot in 1965, the course having been established using turf from Hurst Park Racecourse, which closed in 1962.

As an owner and breeder of racehorses, Queen Elizabeth II took a keen interest in racing. The jockeys riding the Queen's horses could be identified by her racing colours: purple body with gold braid, scarlet sleeves, and a black velvet cap with gold fringe. The Queen attended the annual Royal Meeting from her Coronation in 1953 to 2021, and traditionally presented The Gold Cup and The Diamond Jubilee Stakes each year. In 2013, The Queen's filly, Estimate, triumphed in Ascot's showpiece race, The Gold Cup – the first time that The Gold Cup has been won by a reigning monarch. In 2004, Ascot Racecourse was closed for a £220 million redevelopment, the single biggest investment in British Racing. The Racecourse was reopened by the Queen on 20 June 2006. The redevelopment was designed by HOK (firm), engineered by Buro Happold and built by Laing O'Rourke. The main part of the redevelopment programme was the construction of the 30m x 300m lightweight parasol roof structure of the grandstand, this was designed and built by Austrian specialist contractor Waagner-Biro.  During the 2005 season, the Royal Ascot was held as York Racecourse.

At the end of 2006, a £10 million programme of further alterations was announced to improve the viewing from lower levels of the grandstand using an innovative steel composite product ("SPS" sandwich plate system) to reprofile the existing concrete terraces.

The seasons – flat and jumps 
The flat season at Ascot is run from April to October, beginning with Royal Ascot Trials Day and finishing with QIPCO British Champions Day. In all, Ascot hosts 18 days of flat racing each year, totalling roughly 115 flat races each summer. Grass is cut to a regulation 4 inches exactly for flat racing. Ascot hosts 13 Group 1 Flat races each year including The Gold Cup, St James's Palace Stakes, King's Stand Stakes, Commonwealth Cup and The King George VI and Queen Elizabeth QIPCO Stakes. QIPCO British Champions Day holds the greatest number of Group 1 races of any raceday at Ascot with four races at the top level. Ascot has hosted many of the world's most famous flat horses including Frankel, Nijinsky, Sagaro, Yeats, Mill Reef, Grundy, Dancing Brave, Swain, Galileo and Enable.

The first jumps fixture was held at Ascot in 1965. The national hunt course, a right handed triangular shaped course like the flat course, is laid out inside the flat track, and is about 1m 5f round, with ten fences, including two in the straight, and six flights of hurdles. The track is famed for being one of the toughest courses with a 73-foot climb from the lowest point, Swinley Bottom, to the highest point, the Winning Post. Ascot hosts 8 days of jumps racing between October and March, starting with the Fireworks Spectacular Family Raceday and finishing with the Spring Family Raceday. Included are both steeplechase and hurdle races, with around 50 jumps races in all being held at Ascot each season. Grass is cut to a regulation 5 inches exactly for jumps racing. Notable jumps races held at Ascot are The Clarence House Chase, The Ascot Chase and The Long Walk Hurdle, all Grade 1 contests. Ascot has hosted many of the world's most famous jumps horses including Arkle, Desert Orchid, Sprinter Sacre, Sire De Grugy, Kauto Star, Cue Card, Baracouda, Thistlecrack, Cyrname and Altior.

Royal Ascot

Royal Ascot evolved from the first four-day race meeting held at Ascot in 1768, although the meeting as it is known today only really started to take shape with the introduction of The Gold Cup in 1807. Until 1939, Royal Ascot was the only race meeting held at the racecourse. The Gold Cup remains the feature race of the third day of Royal Ascot, traditionally the busiest day of the week, when high fashion and exquisite millinery take centre stage alongside flat racing's most elite stayers. During the racecourse's redevelopment in 2005, the Royal Meeting was held at York Racecourse.

Each of the five days of Royal Ascot begins with the Royal Procession at 2pm, when the monarch and other members of the royal family arrive down the straight mile in the Royal Landaus, accompanied by the playing of the National Anthem and the raising of the Royal Standard. This tradition was started in 1825 by King George IV.

Royal Ascot is Britain's most valuable race meeting, attracting many of the world's finest racehorses to compete for millions of pounds in prize money (just over £7.3million in 2019). Approximately 500 horses race across the five days. Eighteen Group races, eight of them Group 1, are staged each year and are broadcast to audiences in almost 200 territories around the world.

Ascot employees increase by more than 6,500 temporary staff, with over 33,500 items of temporary furniture and 20,000 flowers and shrubs grown especially for the Royal Meeting.

There are four enclosures in total at Royal Ascot, three of them open to the public. The Royal Enclosure is the most prestigious, with access strictly limited. First-time applicants must apply to the Royal Enclosure Office and gain sponsorship from someone who has attended the Royal Enclosure for at least four years. Existing members are sent invitations by Her Majesty's Representative to request badges each year. Badges are hand written and can only be worn by the named person. Colours of badges vary for each day of the Royal Meeting.

The Royal Enclosure has the strictest Dress Code, with men wearing grey, navy or black morning dress and top hat, and women wearing formal daywear and a hat with a solid base of 4 inches or more in diameter. The origins of the Royal Ascot Dress Code can be traced back to the early 19th century when Beau Brummel, a close friend of the Prince Regent, decreed that men of elegance should wear waisted black coats and white cravats with pantaloons to the Royal Meeting.

The Queen Anne Enclosure is Royal Ascot's premier public enclosure, granting guests access to the Parade Ring, Grandstand and Trackside Lawns. Guests in the Queen Anne Enclosure are also invited to participate in the daily tradition of singing around the Bandstand after racing. The Dress Code in the Queen Anne Enclosure is still formal, but more relaxed than that of the Royal Enclosure. Women must dress in a manner that befits a formal occasion and must wear a hat or fascinator at all times. Gentlemen are required to wear a full-length suit with a collared shirt, tie and socks covering the ankle.

The Windsor Enclosure offers a more informal and relaxed atmosphere. There is no formal Dress Code, but guests are encouraged to wear "smart daywear"—collared shirts and jackets for men, hats or fascinators for women. Guests in the Windsor Enclosure are the first to view the Royal Procession as the enclosure is positioned to the east of the Grandstand along the Straight Mile. The Village Enclosure has been a successful addition since 2017 and is located on the Heath, in the middle of the racecourse. This enclosure, open from the Thursday to Saturday of the Royal Meeting, offers a combination of exciting street food, al fresco dining, live music and unique views of the track and famous Ascot Grandstand.

The Dress Code in the Village Enclosure is similar, but slightly less formal to that of the Queen Anne Enclosure, with women wearing formal daywear and a hat and men wearing jackets, full-length trousers, a tie and socks covering the ankle.

The annual Royal Meeting takes place over five days, each with a unique offering of racing and atmosphere. The week begins on a Tuesday, with the first race traditionally being The Queen Anne Stakes. Two further Group 1 contests normally take place on this day, which is surely the most enjoyable for racing purists. The King's Stand Stakes and The St James' Palace Stakes round off the feature races on the card.

The Wednesday of Royal Ascot provides a relaxed atmosphere off the track and an intense atmosphere on it, with the highlight on the card being the prestigious Group 1 Prince of Wales's Stakes, so memorably won in 2019 by superstars Crystal Ocean and Frankie Dettori.

Undoubtedly the most electric day of the Royal Meeting is Thursday, with the oldest and most prestigious race taking place – The Gold Cup staged over two-and-a-half miles, making it a stiff test for even the world's most elite long-distance horses. In 2020, this historic race was taken by reigning champion, Stradivarius, with jockey Frankie Dettori on board, for a third consecutive year. It is also the day where high fashion and millinery masterpieces take centre stage, and has been colloquially termed "Ladies Day".

The fourth day of the Royal Meeting features two Group 1 races in The Coronation Stakes and The Commonwealth Cup, whilst the final day, Saturday, offers a relaxed and social atmosphere. The quality of racing is no less top-notch, with The Diamond Jubilee Stakes being the feature race, won in 2019 by Blue Point, who famously became the first horse since Choisir to win the Diamond Jubilee and King's Stand in the same year.

The 2020 meeting was held behind closed doors due to the COVID-19 pandemic.

QIPCO King George Diamond Weekend 
While the grandeur of Royal Ascot takes centre stage in June, Ascot's premier summer race actually takes place in July. As Europe's midsummer middle-distance showpiece, The King George VI and Queen Elizabeth QIPCO Stakes has seen many champions crowned including legends such as Mill Reef, Dancing Brave, Nashwan, Galileo and Enable. In 2020 Enable made history by becoming the first triple winner of the race having also landed the crown in 2019 following an epic duel with Crystal Ocean and as a three-year-old in 2017. There are also two dual winners to date – Dahlia and Swain.

British Champions Day

Since 2011 Ascot has staged QIPCO British Champions Day annually in October, now the culmination of the European elite flat racing season. The great Frankel won The Queen Elizabeth II Stakes on Champions Day 2011, and the curtain came down on the career of officially the best horse of all time when he won The Champion Stakes a year later. Sir Henry Cecil's pride and joy won five of his 14 races at Ascot in all.

The culmination of the British Champions Series, QIPCO British Champions Day sees the crowning of the Champion Jockey, Champion Apprentice, Champion Trainer and Champion Owner of each year. The day hosts five Group races, four of them being Group 1, providing a truly unique day of quality racing. The meeting also has a strong social atmosphere, with a post-racing after party seeing off the flat season in style.

Notable races

Shergar Cup

The Shergar Cup is an annual event, taking place in August, at Ascot since 2000. Named in honour of Shergar, who won the 1981 Epsom Derby, the day was originally sponsored by Shergar's owner, the Aga Khan. Now sponsored by Dubai Duty Free, the event attracts approximately 30,000 spectators each year.

The world's premier international jockeys competition has four teams: Great Britain and Ireland, Europe, The Rest of The World and The Girls. Teams compete for points in each of the six races in an attempt to win the Shergar Cup, presented to the winning team at the closing ceremony. The Alistair Haggis Silver Saddle is also awarded to the jockey with the most points at the end of the day, with previous winners including Kieren Fallon, Ryan Moore, Sammy Jo Bell and Hayley Turner.

A post racing concert is also held at the Dubai Duty Free Shergar Cup, with previous acts including Rita Ora, Craig David and All Saints.

Family racedays at Ascot 
Ascot Racecourse holds four annual family racedays:

 The Spring Family Raceday in March
 The Summer Mile Family Raceday in July
 The Fireworks Spectacular Family Raceday in October or November
 The Christmas Family Raceday in December

Each day hosts a plethora of additional activities for children and aims to promote a love of racing in younger generations.

Ascot Racecourse launched the Colts and Fillies club, a free club for children aged 17 and under, in 2002. It has 20,000 members and promotes making racing more accessible for younger audiences. The club owns a racehorse and organises trips, competitions, days out and special activities on Family Racedays.

Events outside of horse racing 
Ascot Racecourse has become a popular venue for events, with 300+ meeting and conference rooms as well as the Grandstand Atrium, with over 4,000 square meters of exhibition space. Many parties and weddings are held at the racecourse every year, including large Asian weddings of up to 1,000 guests.

Royal Ascot Cricket Club and Ascot United

The racecourse is also home to Royal Ascot Cricket Club, which was founded in 1883. The club's ground is situated in the middle of the racecourse. Ascot United F.C. is located towards the eastern side of the site. A new clubhouse, stand and floodlighting have recently been erected.

In popular culture
The 1910 Royal Meeting was the inspiration for Cecil Beaton's Ascot Gavotte scene in My Fair Lady (1964), as, following the death of King Edward VII, Royal Ascot became "Black Ascot" with all occupants of the Royal Enclosure 'dressing in black, save for white flowers or strings of pearls'.

The racecourse has been used for filming many times – most notably three times in James Bond productions, the first being in A View to a Kill (1985), where Bond (played by Roger Moore) was beginning his mission to defeat Max Zorin (Christopher Walken), whose horse was racing there. The racecourse was used again for GoldenEye (1995), where the entrance stood in for St. Petersburg Airport, and finally in Skyfall (2012) where it stood in for Shanghai Pudong International Airport.

Gallery

References

Bibliography

External links

Main Ascot website
Royal Ascot website
BBC Royal Ascot interactive guide
Course guide on GG.COM
Royal Ascot Guide
Royal Ascot Bloodline Interactive Tool

 
Buildings and structures in the Royal Borough of Windsor and Maidenhead
Sports venues in Berkshire
Horse racing venues in England
Sports venues completed in 1711
1711 establishments in England
Sunninghill and Ascot